Prostatitis is an umbrella term for a variety of medical conditions that incorporate bacterial and non-bacterial origin illnesses in the pelvic region. In contrast with the plain meaning of the word (which means "inflammation of the prostate"), the diagnosis may not always include inflammation. Prostatitis is classified into acute, chronic, asymptomatic inflammatory prostatitis, and chronic pelvic pain syndrome.

In the United States, prostatitis is diagnosed in 8% of all male urologist visits and 1% of all primary care physician visits for male genitourinary symptoms.

Classification
The term prostatitis refers to inflammation of the tissue of the prostate gland. It may occur as an appropriate physiological response to an infection, or it may occur in the absence of infection.

In 1999, the National Institute of Diabetes and Digestive and Kidney Diseases (NIDDK) devised a new classification system.  For more specifics about each type of prostatitis, including information on symptoms, treatment, and prognosis, follow the links to the relevant full articles.

In 1968, Meares and Stamey determined a classification technique based upon the culturing of bacteria. This classification is no longer used.

The conditions are distinguished by the different presentation of pain, white blood cells (WBCs) in the urine, duration of symptoms and bacteria cultured from the urine. To help express prostatic secretions that may contain WBCs and bacteria, prostate massage is sometimes used.

See also
 Interstitial cystitis — a related disease
 Granulomatous prostatitis
 IgG4-related prostatitis
 Male accessory gland infection (MAGI)

References

External links 

  Prostatitis Self Assessment Calculator

Inflammations
Inflammatory prostate disorders
Men's health